Mastigosciadium is a genus of flowering plants belonging to the family Apiaceae.

Its native range is Afghanistan.

Species:
 Mastigosciadium hysteranthum Rech.f. & Kuber

References

Apiaceae
Apiaceae genera